In July 2022, England played a three-test series against Australia as part of the 2022 mid-year rugby union tests. They played the Wallabies at three locations across Australia within as many weeks, with the overall winner receiving the Ella-Mobbs Trophy.

Coming into the series, England were ranked in fifth place in the World Rugby Rankings, while Australia sat one place below in sixth. The two nations had most recently contested a test series in 2016, which England won for the first time, with a historic 3–0 "whitewash" on Australian soil.

The 2016 series marked the start of England's eight-match winning streak against Australia, whose most recent victory in the fixture was in the 2015 Rugby World Cup pool stages. However, the first test of the 2022 tour on 2 July ended that streak, as Australia claimed a 30–28 victory in Perth. The following week, on 9 July, England leveled the series with a 25–17 win in Brisbane. In the deciding test on 16 July, England clinched the series, triumphing over Australia by 21–17 in Sydney.

Fixtures

Squads 
Note: Ages, caps and clubs are as of 2 July 2022, the first test match of the tour.

England 
On 20 June 2022, England head coach Eddie Jones named a 36-man squad for the summer test series against Australia.

On 30 June 2022, Charlie Ewels withdrew from the tour due to a knee injury sustained in training. He was replaced in the squad by Sam Jeffries.

On 4 July 2022 Tom Curry withdrew from the tour due to a concussion sustained in the first test.

On 11 July 2022 Maro Itoje and Sam Underhill withdrew from the squad following concussions sustained in the second test.

Coaching team:
 Head coach:  Eddie Jones
 Defence coach:  Anthony Seibold
 Attack coach:  Martin Gleeson
 Forwards coach:  Richard Cockerill
 Scrum coach:  Matt Proudfoot

Australia 
On 12 June 2022, Australia head coach Dave Rennie named a 35-man squad for the summer test series against England.

On 20 June 2022, Harry Johnson-Holmes joined up with the squad from the Australia A team, as injury cover for Taniela Tupou. However, he later withdrew due to injury, and was replaced by Sam Talakai.

On 24 June 2022, Ned Hanigan also joined up with the squad, as injury cover for Jed Holloway.

On 5 July 2022, Reece Hodge was called up to the squad from the Australia A team, as an injury replacement for Tom Banks.

Coaching team:
 Head coach:  Dave Rennie
 Defence coach:  Matt Taylor
 Attack coach:  Scott Wisemantel
 Forwards coach:  Dan McKellar
 Scrum coach:  Petrus du Plessis

Matches

First test 

Notes:
 Quade Cooper (Australia) had been named in the starting line-up, but pulled up injured in the warm-up. He was substituted by Noah Lolesio, who in turn was replaced on the bench by James O'Connor.
 Caderyn Neville and Dave Porecki (both Australia) and Henry Arundell and Jack van Poortvliet (both England) made their international debuts.
 This was Australia's first win over England in nine games.

Second test 

Notes:
 Jack Willis (England) was originally named among the substitutes, but pulled out prior to the match due to a rib injury. He was replaced on the bench by Will Joseph.
 Nick Frost (Australia) and Tommy Freeman, Guy Porter and Will Joseph (all England) made their international debuts.

Third test 

Notes:
 Nic White (Australia) earned his 50th test cap.
 Suliasi Vunivalu (Australia) made his international debut.
 This was the first rugby union test match held at the Sydney Cricket Ground since Australia hosted Argentina in 1986.
 England won the Ella-Mobbs Trophy (previously the Cook Cup) for the first time.

See also
 2022 mid-year rugby union tests
 History of rugby union matches between Australia and England

Notes

References 

2022
2021–22 in English rugby union
2022 rugby union tours
2022 in Australian rugby union